Andrés Amaya ( - 29 October 1704) was a Spanish Baroque painter in oils of religious subjects. He was active in the region of Castile and León, primarily in the city of Valladolid.

Biography

Nothing is known about Amaya's origins and background, and little about his life and career. One modern Spanish source describes his life and activity as cubierta por una enorme bruma ("covered by an enormous mist"). The best that can be said is, that the surname "Amaya" is associated with the small village of Amaya in Burgos, Castile and León. Few of his paintings are dated, which makes it difficult to establish a chronology. Most of his works are on religious subjects, but he is said to have also painted portraits. His surviving works are scattered in and around Valladolid.

According to Spanish art historian Juan Agustín Ceán Bermúdez (1749-1829), Amaya was a disciple of Vicente Carducho (1576/78–1638). Amaya cannot have been Carducho's pupil, because their dates do not overlap. He has also been said to have been influenced by Alonzo Cano (1601-1667).

In 1687, Valladolid painter Amaro Alonso de Llanos (Amaro Alonso Méndez, 1640–1699) married Damiana Jalón y Gallo, widow of the painter Juan Sanz. Amaya was one of the witnesses. That is one of the very few contemporary records of Amaya's existence.

His wife was Isabel. They lived "outside the Puerta del Campo"; that is, roughly in the area of the modern  in Valladolid. Amaya died on 29 October 1704. The Valladolid painter Ignacio de Prado was his pupil; Amaya's widow called Ignacio "una persona de mi cariño y de que tengo entera satisfacción" ("a person in my affection and in whom I have complete satisfaction").

Critical reception
Ceán Bermúdez said of Amaya, "tienen mejor gusto de color que correccion en el dibuxo" ("he had better taste in colour than in correctness of drawing"). Spanish art historian  (1935-2010) had a more generous opinion. So had the anonymous author who wrote for the Museo Nacional de Escultura, Valladolid in 2001, "Fue artista bien preparada para la composición, mostrando gran habilidad en la angrupación y relación de las figuras" ("He was a masterful artist in composition, showing great skill in the grouping and relationship of people").

Works
These works have been attributed to Amaya:
 1682Pinturas del retablo mayor ("paintings at the main altar"),  
 1693San Francisco y Santa Teresa ("St Francis and St Teresa"),  
 La Virgen apareciéndose a Fernando III el Santo ("The Virgin appears to Fernando III the Saint"), Museo Nacional de Escultura, Valladolid
 Last third of 17th centuryApparizione della Vergine ad un domenicano di Soriano ("The Virgin appears to a Dominican in Soriano"), Museo Nacional de Escultura, 
 Sagrada Familia ("The Holy Family"), Iglesia Penitencial de la Vera Cruz, Valladolid 
 San Joaquín ("St Joachim"),  
 Unknown dateSan José con el Niño ("St Joseph and the Christ Child"), Valladolid Cathedral
 Unknown dateSan José con el Niño ("St Joseph and the Christ Child"), Museo Nacional de Escultura, Valladolid 
 Unknown dateSerie de lienzos sobre la vida de San Juan Bautista ("series of paintings on the life of St John the Baptist"), Basílica de San Isidoro, León
 Unknown dateunknown subject,  
 Unknown dateunknown subject, San Millán de la Cogolla
 Unknown dateunknown subject, Toro, Zamora
 Unknown dateunknown subject, Villafranca del Bierzo

Gallery

Notes

References

Year of birth unknown
Place of birth unknown
1704 deaths
People from Valladolid
17th-century Spanish painters
Spanish male painters
Painters from Castile and León
Spanish Baroque painters
Religious painters